The 1st Session of the 10th National People's Congress was held from March 5 to March 18 in Beijing, China, in conjunction with the 2003 session of the Chinese People's Political Consultative Conference. 

The 2953 delegates of the Congress elected the following state leaders:
President of the People's Republic of China: Hu Jintao
Vice-President of the People's Republic of China: Zeng Qinghong
Chairman of the Standing Committee of the National People's Congress: Wu Bangguo
Chairman of the Central Military Commission: Jiang Zemin
President of the Supreme People's Court: Xiao Yang
Procurator-General of the Supreme People's Procuratorate: Jia Chunwang (贾春旺)
The delegates appointed the following state officers:
Premier of the State Council of the People's Republic of China: Wen Jiabao
Vice Premiers: Huang Ju, Wu Yi, Zeng Peiyan, Hui Liangyu
State Councilors: Zhou Yongkang, Cao Gangchuan, Tang Jiaxuan, Hua Jianmin, Chen Zhili
Secretary General of the State Council: Hua Jianmin (华建敏)
The delegates also approved the following nominations by the new Premier:
Minister of Foreign Affairs: Li Zhaoxing (李肇星)
Minister of National Defence: Cao Gangchuan
Director of National Development and Reform Commission: Ma Kai
Minister of Education: Zhou Ji (周济)
Minister of Science and Technology: Xu Guanhua
Director of State Commission of Science, Technology and Industry for National Defense: Zhang Yunchuan (张云川)
Director of State Ethnic Affairs Commission: Li Dezhu (李德洙)
Minister of Public Security: Zhou Yongkang
Minister of State Security: Xu Yongyue
Minister of Supervision: Li Zhilun (李至伦)
Minister of Civil Affairs: Li Xueju (李学举)
Minister of Justice: Zhang Fusen
Minister of Finance: Jin Renqing (金人庆)
Minister of Personnel: Zhang Bolin (张柏林)
Minister of Labor and Social Security: Zheng Silin (郑斯林)
Minister of Land and Resources: Tian Fengshan (田凤山)
Minister of Construction: Wang Guotao (汪光焘)
Minister of Railway: Liu Zhijun
Minister of Communications: Zhang Chunxian (张春贤)
Minister of Information Industry: Wang Xudong (王旭东)
Minister of Water Resources: Wang Shucheng (汪恕诚)
Minister of Agriculture: Du Qinglin (杜青林)
Minister of Commerce: Lu Fuyuan (吕福源)
Minister of Culture: Sun Jiazheng (孙家正)
Minister of Health: Zhang Wenkang (张文康)
Director of National Population and Family Planning Commission: Zhang Weiqing (张维庆)
President of the People's Bank of China: Zhou Xiaochuan
Auditor General of the National Audit Office: Li Jinhua

External links

National Peoples Congress, 2003
National People's Congresses

zh:第十届全国人民代表大会#第一次会议